Amirkabir's bleak (Alburnus amirkabiri) is a species of freshwater fish in the family Cyprinidae, endemic to Iran. Recent research has indicated that A. amirkabiri is probably a synonym of Alburnus doriae.

References

Alburnus
Fish described in 2015
Taxa named by Keivan Abbasi
Endemic fauna of Iran